The Cairns Dolphins are an Australian basketball team based in Cairns, Queensland. The Dolphins compete in the women's NBL1 North league and play their home games at Early Settler Stadium.

Team history
After operating a successful basketball program in Cairns, Queensland, Cairns Basketball joined the Queensland State Basketball League in its second season in 1987. They fielded two teams, the Cairns Marlins in the men's competition and the Cairns Dolphins in the women's competition.

After a successful first season for the NBL1 in 2019, in 2020 it expanded into Queensland and replaced the QBL. After this change, the Dolphins transferred to the NBL1 North.

Season by season

Current squad

References

External links
Cairns Basketball's official website

 
Queensland Basketball League teams
Basketball teams established in 1987
Basketball teams in Queensland
1987 establishments in Australia
Sport in Cairns